Rhabdoderma is an extinct genus of coelacanth fish in the class Sarcopterygii.  It lived in the Carboniferous and Early Triassic, and its fossils have been found in Europe, Madagascar and North America.

Species 
 Rhabdoderma alderingi Moy-Thomas, 1937
 Rhabdoderma ardrossense Moy-Thomas, 1937
 Rhabdoderma elegans (Newberry 1856)
 Rhabdoderma exiguum (Eastman, 1902)
 Rhabdoderma huxleyi (Traquair, 1881)
 Rhabdoderma madagascariensis (Woodward, 1910)
 Rhabdoderma? newelli (Hibbard, 1933)
 Rhabdoderma tinglyense

Bibliography
Discovering Fossil Fishes by John Maisey and John G. Maisey

References

Rhabdodermatidae
Prehistoric lobe-finned fish genera
Carboniferous fish of Europe
Carboniferous fish of North America